Knowing What You Know Now is the second studio album by English alternative rock band Marmozets, released by Roadrunner Records on 26 January 2018. It garnered positive reviews from critics who praised the band for being more straightforward with their sound while retaining their musicianship. Knowing What You Know Now peaked at number 23 on the UK Charts and spawned three singles: "Play", "Habits" and "Major System Error".

Critical reception

Knowing What You Know Now received positive reviews from music critics who lauded the band for retaining their musicianship while adapting a more straightforward sound. At Metacritic, which assigns a normalized rating out of 100 to reviews from mainstream critics, the album received an average score of 79, based on 9 reviews.

Lizzie Cooper-Smith of Rock Sound praised the group for refining their "unique brand of controlled chaos" throughout the record and showing confidence in their distinct musicianship to "easily fuse brashness with catchy melodies, complexity with moments where you can catch your breath", concluding that "This long-awaited second album isn’t just thrilling from start to finish: it might also be exactly what rock needs right now." Dave Simpson of The Guardian said that the group retained their trademark musicianship while also showing maturity by adopting "rave-type breakdowns, euphoric pop rushes and a tender ballad" throughout the album and displaying youthful textures that are inspired by English alternative rock acts like Kate Bush, Madness and Siouxsie and the Banshees. He concluded that despite the generic grunginess of the last two tracks he felt that Marmozets "have made their great leap forward." Thea de Gallier from NME said, "Much of the surprisingly retro sound undoubtedly comes from Norton's production techniques, but at no point does Knowing...' sound dated. In fact, it marks Marmozets out as a band who aren't afraid to play with their sound."

Will Richards of DIY compared the band positively to Cedric Bixler-Zavala and At the Drive-In in terms of reining in their idiosyncratic vocals and musicianship, saying "For every radio-ready chorus, there’s a fascinating tangent, and plenty of pointers towards Marmozets being the most important rock band we have." Haydon Benfield of Renowned for Sound, despite pointing out the "highly repetitious lyrics" found in "Insomnia", gave praise to Norton's production for highlighting the band's push to new musical territories on "Like a Battery" and "Run with the Rhythm" while showcasing their "punkish high-energy affairs" on the singles and lead singer Becca Macintyre for having a compelling presence in her vocal delivery, concluding that "[I]f you’re after a loud, fast, and fun album you can’t go past Marmozets’ Knowing What You Know Now." AllMusic editor John D. Buchanan commended the band for going with a more "straightforward" approach with their sound on their sophomore record, praising the instrumentation throughout the track listing and Macintyre's vocal range going from "breathless gasps and falsetto peaks to deeper notes and theatrical yelps", concluding that "[I]t sounds as if the band have outgrown the need to prove themselves with overt technicality and are happy to just enjoy rocking out."

Conversely, Cady Siregar from Drowned in Sound gave credit to each track for having pulsating energy and strong vocals, but felt there was an overabundance of angst throughout the production, lyrics that caused the songs to blend with each other and a lack of respite and wisdom to calm the listeners.

Track listing

Credits 
Adapted from the liner notes of Knowing What You Know Now.

Personnel 
Marmozets
 Becca Macintyre – vocals
 Sam Macintyre – guitar, vocals
 Jack Bottomley – guitar
 Will Bottomley – bass, vocals
 Josh Macintyre – drums

Additional musicians
 Larry Hibbitt – percussion

Production
 Gil Norton – production
 Danny Allin – engineering, programming
 Michael H. Brauer – mixing
 Curtis Elvidge - assistant
 Matthew Glasbey - assistant
 Steve Vealey – mix assistant
 Joe LaPorta – mastering
 Tom Manning - assistant
 Callum Marinho - assistant
 Steve Vealey - mixing assistant

Artwork and design
 Florian Mihr – design
 Steve Gulick – photography

Charts

References

2018 albums
Marmozets albums
Roadrunner Records albums
Albums produced by Gil Norton